Zoltán Németh (born May 5, 1972) is a Hungarian teacher and politician, member of the National Assembly (MP) for Budafok-Tétény (Budapest Constituency XXXII) between 2010 and 2014.

He became a member of the Committee on Youth, Social, Family, and Housing affairs on February 11, 2013. Németh served as the leader of the Fidesz group in the General Assembly of Budapest since the 2010 local elections.

References

1972 births
Living people
Fidesz politicians
Members of the National Assembly of Hungary (2010–2014)
Politicians from Budapest